Los Osos Oaks State Natural Reserve is a California State Park in western San Luis Obispo County, in the Central Coast of California region. It preserves centuries-old coast live oaks (Quercus agrifolia) growing atop relict sand dunes.  It is located in the Los Osos Valley between San Luis Obispo and Baywood Park-Los Osos, just outside the town of Los Osos.  The  park was established in 1972.

Area history
There are several prehistoric sites in the proximate vicinity of the Los Osos Oaks State Natural Reserve, in addition to archaeological recovery within the reserve itself. A significant-sized Chumash site, Los Osos Back Bay, has been partially excavated on a stabilized sand dune slightly to the north of the reserve dating to at least as early as 1200 CE.

Proposed for closure
The reserve was one of several state parks threatened with closure in 2008. After the 2009 California state special elections, in which voters turned down a package of propositions dealing with California budget crisis, Governor Arnold Schwarzenegger proposed the temporary closure (for at least 2 years) of 220 parks.  The closures were ultimately avoided by cutting hours and maintenance system-wide.

See also
California oak woodland
Elfin Forest Natural Area — in Baywood-Los Osos.
List of California state parks
Protected areas of San Luis Obispo County, California

References

External links 
California State Parks: official Los Osos Oaks State Natural Reserve website
 Hikespeak Blog: Los Osos Oaks State Natural Reserve — images, info, map.

California State Reserves
Parks in San Luis Obispo County, California
Morro Bay
Protected areas established in 1972
1972 establishments in California